The Dharhi are a Muslim community found in the state of Uttar Pradesh in  India.

Origin

Their name is a corruption of the Sanskrit word , which means impudent. The community are traditionally associated with singing. They are found in Gopamau and Sandhila in Hardoi District, Kakori in Lucknow District and Lakhimpur in Lakhimpur Kheri District. A small number are also found in Raibareli and Faizabad districts. The Dharhi  speak the Awadhi dialect.

Present circumstances

The Dharhi are strictly endogamous, and practice consanguineous marriages. They prefer marriages within the lineage, which are known as biradaris. Members of a biradari are supposedly descended from a common male ancestor. There are said to be forty biradaris, the main ones being the Balrampuria, Chaurasiya, Jaunpuriya and Desi. The biradaris get their name from their place of origin.

The Dharhi are still involved with singing and playing the table for their patron communities. A majority of the community are now daily wage labourers. They live in multi-caste villages, and each settlement has an informal caste council. These caste councils act as an instrument of social control. The Dharhi are Sunni Muslims, although they incorporate a number of folk beliefs.

See also
Mirasi

References

Social groups of Uttar Pradesh
Muslim communities of Uttar Pradesh
Muslim communities of India
Dom in India
Dom people
Romani in India